Leshko Point (‘Nos Leshko’ \'nos 'le-shko\) is the point on the north side of the entrance to Beripara Cove on the southeast coast of Liège Island in the Palmer Archipelago, Antarctica.

The point is named after the settlement of Leshko in Southwestern Bulgaria.

Location
British mapping in 1978.

Maps
 British Antarctic Territory.  Scale 1:200000 topographic map. DOS 610 Series, Sheet W 64 60. Directorate of Overseas Surveys, UK, 1978.
 Antarctic Digital Database (ADD). Scale 1:250000 topographic map of Antarctica. Scientific Committee on Antarctic Research (SCAR). Since 1993, regularly upgraded and updated.

References
 Bulgarian Antarctic Gazetteer. Antarctic Place-names Commission. (details in Bulgarian, basic data in English)
 Leshko Point. SCAR Composite Antarctic Gazetteer.

External links
 Leshko Point. Copernix satellite image

Headlands of the Palmer Archipelago
Bulgaria and the Antarctic
Liège Island